Kevin Randall Pucetas (born November 27, 1984) is an American professional baseball pitcher.

Career
Pucetas attended Broome High School and Limestone College. Pucetas was selected in the 17th round of the 2006 MLB amateur entry draft. He participated in the 2008 All-Star Futures Game. For the Fresno Grizzlies in 2009, Pucetas was 10–6 with a 5.04 earned run average.

On October 15, 2010, Pucetas was traded to the Kansas City Royals as the player to be named later that sent José Guillén to the San Francisco Giants.

He was designated for assignment on June 10, 2011.

Pucetas was released by the Royals and picked up by the Washington Nationals on March 28, 2012.

Pucetas was signed to a minor league contract by the Texas Rangers on January 15, 2013. The deal did not include an invite to Major League camp. Pucetas pitched for the Frisco RoughRiders of the Class AA Texas League in 2013. After the season, he agreed to try to become a knuckleball pitcher.

Pucetas signed a minor league contract with the San Francisco Giants for the 2015 season, making his way back to the team that first drafted him. He became a free agent after the 2015 season.

References

External links

Sportspeople from Spartanburg, South Carolina
1984 births
Living people
Salem-Keizer Volcanoes players
Augusta GreenJackets players
San Jose Giants players
Fresno Grizzlies players
Omaha Storm Chasers players
Limestone Saints baseball players
Baseball players from South Carolina